116 Squadron or 116th Squadron may refer to:

 116 Squadron (Israel)
 116 Squadron, Republic of Singapore Air Force, see list of Republic of Singapore Air Force squadrons
 No. 116 Squadron RCAF, Canada
 No. 116 Squadron RAF, United Kingdom
 116th Air Control Squadron, United States Air Force
 116th Air Refueling Squadron, United States Air Force
 VAW-116, United States Navy